The Chamber of Deputies (Spanish: Cámara de Diputados) is the lower house of the Congress of the Union, the bicameral parliament of Mexico. The other chamber is the Senate. The structure and responsibilities of both chambers of Congress are defined in Articles 50 to 70 of the constitution.

History
Bicameral legislature, including the Chamber of Deputies, was established on 4 October 1824. Unicameral Congress was in place from 7 September 1857 to 13 November 1874.

After being drafted, one copy of the Declaration of Independence of the Mexican Empire was given to the Provisional Governmental Board, which was later put on display in the Chamber of Deputies until 1909, when fire destroyed the location.

Composition
The Chamber of Deputies is composed of one federal representative (in Spanish: diputado federal) for every 200,000 citizens. The Chamber has 500 members, elected using the parallel voting system. Elections are every 3 years.

Of these, 300 "majority deputies" are directly elected by plurality from single-member districts, the federal electoral districts (with each state divided into at least two districts). The remaining 200 "party deputies" are assigned through rules of proportional representation in 5 multi-state, 40-seat constituencies. These seats are not tied to districts; rather, they are allocated to parties based on each party's share of the national vote. The 200 party deputies are intended to counterbalance the sectional interests of the district-based representatives. Substitutes are elected at the same time as each deputy, so special elections are rare.

From 1917 to 2015, deputies were barred from serving consecutive terms in accordance with the Constitution's ban on immediate re-election to the legislature. Thus, the Chamber of Deputies was one of the few legislative bodies in the world that was completely renewed at an election. However, this changed with the 2018 elections, and deputies are now permitted to run for re-election three times consecutively. A deputy who has served two terms may serve again after sitting out one term. Congressional elections held halfway into the president's six-year mandate are known as mid-term elections.

The current composition of the Chamber of Deputies is as follows:

Last election

2021

 Of the 210 seats won by the MORENA-PT–PES alliance, 97 were taken by MORENA, 57 by the PT, and 56 by the PES

 Of the 63 seats won by the PAN–PRD–MC alliance, 37 were taken by the PAN, 17 by the MC, and 9 by the PRD

 Of the 13 seats won by the PRI–PVEM–PNA alliance, 6 were taken by the PRI, 5 by the PVEM, and 2 by the PNA

See also
President of the Chamber of Deputies Directive Board
Congress of Mexico
Senate of Mexico
Politics of Mexico
Electoral regions of Mexico

References

External links
 (in Spanish)

1824 establishments in Mexico
Congress of the Union
Mexico